Dyera is a genus of tropical trees up to 80 m in height. They are in family Apocynaceae, native to southeast Asia. It was first described as a genus in 1882, by Joseph Dalton Hooker.

Species 
Plants of the World Online recognises the following species:
 Dyera costulata  - Thailand, Peninsular Malaysia, Borneo, Sumatra
 Dyera polyphylla  - Borneo, Sumatra

References

External links

Apocynaceae genera
Rauvolfioideae
Taxa named by Joseph Dalton Hooker